Nura Abdullahi (born 17 August 1997) is a Nigerian former professional footballer.

Club career
He made his Serie B debut for Perugia on 3 February 2018 in a game against Cittadella.

He retired in April 2019 on medical grounds.

References

External links
 

1997 births
People from Kaduna State
Living people
Nigerian footballers
Spezia Calcio players
A.S. Roma players
A.C. Perugia Calcio players
Serie B players
Serie D players
Nigerian expatriate footballers
Expatriate footballers in Italy
Nigerian expatriate sportspeople in Italy
Association football defenders
U.S.D. Lavagnese 1919 players
Abuja F.C. players